The Army Reconnaissance Detachment 10 is a special forces unit of the Swiss Army responsible for conducting counter-terrorist activities in Switzerland and abroad. The full cost of maintaining the ARD-DDR-DEE in 2011 was approximately 16 million francs.

The ARD 10 is one of two special operations units of Switzerland. The other, the "MP Spez Det." or "Special Detachment of the Military Police", focuses primarily on domestic issues.

History
As part of the Army XXI reforms, a report on October 24, 2001 to the Federal Assembly of Switzerland called for the formation of a special forces–trained unit that would be able to conduct counter-terrorist-type actions in the Swiss Army to protect Swiss nationals and soldiers living abroad.

In 2003, the unit was created with Major Daniel Stoll as the unit's first commanding officer. 30 soldiers with special forces training formed the nucleus of the unit, with its internal structure based on the Special Air Service. In 2007, ARD 10 commandos joined in Exercise Cold Response 2007. The unit had been unveiled to the public during Army Day 2007 in Lugano from November 20 to November 25, 2007. Critics had blasted the creation of the ARD 10, saying that that unit might conduct anti-terrorist missions that may put civilians in harm's way contrary to their mission. The Zeit-Fragen, a weekly newspaper, also claimed that the ARD 10 would be a blow to Swiss neutrality, saying that crisis situations involving Swiss nationals are always solved through negotiations.

By 2011, the unit has 91 soldiers in active duty. Forty operators currently serve in the ranks of ARD 10.

It is suggested that the first batch of ARD 10 operators had been given training by foreign special forces instructors. They include instructors from the United States Navy SEALs, US Special Forces, and the Special Air Service.

There has been calls on the Swiss government to deploy ARD 10 operators to combat Somali pirates with no consensus in Parliament, due to an evenly divided vote against it. The planned mission called for 30 ARD 10 operators to be deployed with a spokesperson for the Swiss Army saying that the ARD 10 is ready to be deployed if given the order. An article criticized the planned mission to Somalia, questioning why ARD 10 operators should shoot at pirates when they are on anti-piracy operations, since most pirates are ex-fishermen and criminals. Furthermore, an article from the Berner Zeitung insists that the ARD 10 deployment is not the solution, but calls for political solutions.

ARD 10 operators were supposed to be covertly deployed into Libya to rescue two hostages held by Gaddafi due to the arrest of his son in Switzerland under "Operation SAKR". Instead, the hostages were released after negotiations between Libya and Switzerland, with the details of the rescue operations leaked to the press. The ARD10 was criticized for being "dangerous" when Swiss media leaked out plans to rescue Swiss nationals in Libya on June 28, 2010. In addition, it is reported that only 40 operators are currently active instead of the initially planned 90. According to Albert Stahel of Zurich University’s Institute for Strategic Studies, an umbrella of the Swiss military's various special forces units should be created, as Switzerland does not have enough resources to strategically transport ARD 10 operators to various places around the globe.

In 2020, it was reported that the ARD10 was supposed to be assigned to protect the Swiss Agency for Development and Cooperation office in Kabul. In August 2021, ARD10 teams were deployed to Kabul to assist in evacuating Swiss/foreign nationals evacuating after the Taliban captured Kabul.

In the Russian-Ukrainian war, ARD10 operators helped evacuate Swiss diplomatic staff from Kyiv in Febraury 2022 and provided close protection for Swiss president Ignazio Cassis when he visited President Zelensky in October 2022.

Unit tasks
The ARD 10 has certain tasks to fulfill as part of their mandate:

 Procurement of key facilities
 Protection of Swiss nationals, troop and facilities if endangered
 Securing Swiss nationals from crisis areas
 Direct Action
 Special Reconnaissance

Requirements
Among the minimal qualification requirements for potential candidates in 18 weeks, these include:

 50 press-ups
 60 sit-ups
 10 chin-ups
 5 km cross-country run in under 24 minutes
 8 km walk in full combat gear (15 kg pack) in less than 58 minutes
 25 km walk in full combat gear (25 kg pack) in less than 3.5 hours
 300 m swim in under 10 minutes

Other potential requirements include the following:

 Good command of the English language
 Good command of another language aside from English
 Leadership skills

Candidates who must wear eyeglasses must have a visual acuity of at least 0.80 in order to be accepted.

The Swiss Army does not institute an age limit for soldiers who wish to join the ARD 10.

Equipment

ARD 10 operators are equipped with the SIG SG 553 (replacing the SIG SG 552) assault carbine with various tactical and night vision scopes, depending on the operator. Their main sniper rifle is the Sako TRG-42 (in-service designation Scharfschützengewehr 04 (SSGw 04)). The MP5SD3 submachine gun is the standard SMG used by the ARD 10.

Their standard sidearms consist of Glock 17 and the Glock 26 alongside the P220. In addition, there are reports that the SIG Pro series are also issued. For training purposes, the G17T and G26T are used.

Their equipment consists of knee protectors, kevlar helmets and anti-shrapnel vests. The ARD's main light infantry vehicle is the AGF.

Training

Potential candidates must attend the full 18 months, of special forces training after completing their compulsory service with the Swiss Army, with 6 months dedicated to basic training and followed by 40 weeks of infiltration technique training. Candidates will be assessed prior to training their physical and mental state, as well as their health if they are fit to be qualified as ARD 10 soldiers. Candidates must also have clean records from their time after attending compulsory service.

Upon completion of training, all ARD 10 soldiers are required to be on standby in case of deployment.

Over 300 soldiers apply for a position in the ARD 10, but only 10 prospective soldiers are chosen for training as ARD 10 operators. Both male and female candidates can apply.

Among the specialist courses taught to all prospective ARD 10 operators include the following:
 Mountain Specialist
 Amphibious Specialist
 Parachute Specialist
 Motorized Specialist

Work conditions
All ARD 10 soldiers are allowed a maximum of 20 days off from active service with the unit, as well as additional 5 days if required. Accommodations in terms of living quarters and food are taken care of by the unit itself without having the individual soldier pay. ARD 10 soldiers stay in the unit for 5 years. Efforts are underway to raise it up to 10 years of service.

The soldiers are paid according to their marital status and economic standing. Extra pay ranges from 397 to 5,156 Swiss francs. Others are paid 4,111 Swiss francs if they have children with extra pay that includes 2,654 Swiss francs. ARD 10 soldiers are also paid if they are deployed abroad, depending on the nature of their mission. Soldiers are paid additionally 6.17 Swiss francs per hour for participating in night duties.

All ARD 10 soldiers have insurance as provided by the Swiss military.

In addition, ARD 10 soldiers are to reimbursed according to federal law with an accommodation maximum of 130 Swiss francs.

See also

References

External links
 Swiss Army, Détachement de Reconnaissance de l’Armée 10, accessed March 2023 
 AAD10 – Im Dienst der Eidgenossenschaft. In: SRF Dok, 3. November 2022 (49 Min.; YouTube, German).

Military counterterrorist organizations
Military units and formations of Switzerland
Special forces of Switzerland